Justin Tipping is an American television and film director, screenwriter, and executive producer best known for his work on Kicks (2016), Flatbush Misdemeanors (2021), and Joe vs. Carole (2022).

Career 
In 2016, Tipping began his career by serving as the director of Kicks. In November 2018, he signed on to direct and co-write a film based on the Harbinger comics. In 2019, he directed episodes of Black Monday, The Chi, and Dear White People. In the same year, he was in discussions to direct the Marvel Cinematic Universe film Shang-Chi and the Legend of the Ten Rings. In 2020, he directed episodes of Dare Me and Twenties. In 2021, he gained notability from directing episodes of Joe vs. Carole, Run the World, and Flatbush Misdemeanors.

Filmography

References

External links 
 

21st-century American male writers
21st-century American screenwriters
American film directors
American television directors
Living people
Place of birth missing (living people)
Year of birth missing (living people)